The 1955 season was FC Steaua București's 8th season since its founding in 1947.

Divizia A

League table

Results 

Source:

Cupa României

Results

See also

 1955 Cupa României
 1955 Divizia A

Notes and references

External links
 1955 FC Steaua București Divizia A matches

FC Steaua București seasons
1955–56 in Romanian football
1954–55 in Romanian football
Steaua, București
Steaua, București
Steaua
Steaua